Pariliacantha is a genus of mantis shrimp containing a single species, Pariliacantha georgeorum. The genus and species were first described by Shane T. Ahyong in 2012.

References

Stomatopoda
Crustaceans described in 2012
Taxa named by Shane T. Ahyong
Monotypic crustacean genera